Shergarh Fort (also known as Qila Shergarh, Bhurkuda Fort) is a ruined fort in Malhipur, Chenari block of Sasaram, it is well connected from Kudra and as well from Sasaram, Bihar. It is a hill fort on a Kaimur plateau about 800 feet in height and was fortified by Emperor Sher Shah Suri. The fort is in dense forest, making access difficult from the bottom of the plateau. The fort lies on the banks of the Durgavati River.

History 
The fort was built between 1540 to 1545 by Emperor Sher Shah Suri. In the 16th century the fort was known as Bhurkuda Qila. It is also claimed that the fort was built by Kharwar rulers and subsequently captured by Sher Shah Suri in 1530.

Architecture 

The area of the fort is nearly 16 km2. Its main entrance originally had eight small domes but now there are only five. One kilometre from the main entrance is a lake called Rani Pokhra (Queen's Pond), and on an adjacent hill is an underground fort.

References

Forts in Bihar
Tourist attractions in Rohtas district
Sur Empire